Kafka au Congo is a 2010 documentary film.

Synopsis
Kafka au Congo is a tragicomic journey behind the scenes of Congo law and politics. Gorette's lands have been unfairly expropriated, and she has spent the last 15 years going from one office to another trying to have her case heard. But whenever she is given an appointment, something gets in the way, she has to grease another bureaucrat and she loses confidence. At the other end of the justice system is the parliamentary administrator, Bahati, in charge of Congo's national parliament's finances, happily making a packet working the corrupt system.

External links 
 

2010 films
Creative Commons-licensed documentary films
Democratic Republic of the Congo documentary films
Belgian documentary films
2010 documentary films
Documentary films about African politics